Lile railway station, formerly Xinmin railway station during planning, is an elevated station on the Guangzhou-Zhuhai intercity railway Jiangmen Spur Line.

The station is located in Lile Avenue in the Lile Sub-district of the Jianghai District of Jiangmen City, Guangdong Province, China, near Xinmin Village Committee.

References

Jiangmen